Parkhotampur is a village in Jatusana Tehsil in Rewari district of Haryana. It belongs to Gurgaon Division.

Demography 
As of 2011 India census, Parkhotampur village had a population of 2205 in 467 households. Males (1210) constitute 54.87%  of the population and females (995) 45.12%. Prakhotampur has an average literacy (1424) rate of 64.58%, less than the national average of 74%: male literacy (874) is 61.37%, and female literacy (550) is 38.62%. Persons belonging to Scheduled Castes (SC) are 1273 and out of which 675 are male and 598 are female. In Prakhotampur, 10.75% of the population is under 6 years of age (270) and 162 are male childs and 108 are female childs.

References

Villages in Rewari district